Glăvan River may refer to:

 Glăvan, a tributary of the Buhui, Romania
 Glăvan, a tributary of the Lozna, Romania